Teri Yaad (Your Memory) was a Pakistani Urdu-language film released on 7 August 1948 in the newly formed country, Pakistan on Eid. 

It starred Nasir Khan and Asha Posley in lead roles.

It was the first film released after the independence of Pakistan on 14 August 1947.

Production

Background
The year 1947 saw the partition of India and the birth of the nation of Pakistan. During this time, the Indian film industry was segregated and the only film production centre left in Pakistan was at Lahore. With the industry reeling in its infancy, it was hard to work on film productions that had been initiated before the partition as many of the working filmmakers and actors had left for or stayed back in India.

With many hardships, the new film industry was able to release its first feature film, Teri Yaad (1948) on 7 August 1948, premièring at the Parbhat Theatre in Lahore. It starred Asha Posley and Nasir Khan, brother of renowned Indian actor Dilip Kumar who had stayed back in Bombay, India. The playback soundtrack was written and composed by Inayat Ali Nath. The playback singers were Munawar Sultana, Asha Posley and Ali Bakhsh Zahoor. Produced by Dewan Sardari Lal's Dewan Pictures and directed by Daud Chand, the film stayed for a significant time on the celluloid screens in Lahore, Quetta and Dhaka,

References

External links
  

1948 films
1940s Urdu-language films
Pakistani drama films
Lollywood
Films set in Lahore
Pakistani black-and-white films
Urdu-language Pakistani films